James, Jim or Jimmy Mills may refer to:
 James Mills (Manitoba politician) (1914–1997), Canadian politician
 James Mills (ship owner) (1847–1936), New Zealand businessman and politician

 James Henry Mills (1923–1973), American Medal of Honor recipient
 James L. Mills (born 1947), American epidemiologist
 James O. Mills, American Egyptologist
 James Mills (author) (born 1932), American journalist and author of a Life magazine series filmed as The Panic in Needle Park
 James P. Mills (1909–1987), American investment banker, throughbred owner, polo player and philanthropist
 James Philip Mills (1890–1960), member of the Indian Civil Service and ethnographer
 James R. Mills (1927–2021), American California state senator
 James Edward Mills, African American author
 Jim Mills (gridiron football) (born 1961), Canadian-American football player
 Jim Mills (rugby) (born 1944), Welsh rugby union and rugby league footballer of the 1960s and 1970s
 Jim Mills (banjo player) (born 1966), American bluesgrass banjo player
 Jimmy Mills (1894–1990), Scottish-American soccer player

See also 
 James Mill (1773–1836), Scottish historian and economist